Marshalltown is an unincorporated community in east-central Craig County, Virginia, United States.

References

Unincorporated communities in Virginia